The Blackfin barracuda (Sphyraena qenie), also known as the Chevron barracuda,  is a species of barracuda that ranges from the Red Sea and East Africa to the Indo and Western Pacific and as far as French Polynesia.

The blackfin barracuda reaches a maximum size of 140 cm. They are typically encountered on coral reefs down to 50 m where they form large schools. The Blackfin barracuda are known for their long black lateral bands that go around its body. There are about 18 to 22 bands that are on the fish's body. They have elongated last rays on the second dorsal fin and anal fins and a blackish caudal fin (tail fin). They lack gill rakers.

References

External links

 

Sphyraenidae
Fish described in 1870